Anna Miserocchi (26 June 1925 - 18 March 1988) was an Italian stage, film, television and voice actress.

Life and career 
Born in Rome, Miserocchi spent her childhood and adolescence in Italian Eritrea, where she had a journalistic apprenticeship. Returned in Italy she studied acting at the Accademia Nazionale di Arte Drammatica Silvio D'Amico, and had her breakout with the stage play The Pillars of Society, directed by Orazio Costa.

Miserocchi was mainly active on stage, in which she specialized in dramatic roles, working among others with Diego Fabbri, Luca Ronconi, Sandro Bolchi. She was also very active in television, where she got her major personal success playing the mother in E le stelle stanno a guardare, while in films she had only sporadic supporting roles. She was also active as a voice actress and a dubber, and among the actresses she lent her voice were Katharine Hepburn, Anne Bancroft, Ava Gardner, Melina Mercouri, Maggie Smith, Irene Papas, Agnes Moorehead and Capucine.

References

External links  

 

1925 births  
1988 deaths  
People from Rome
Italian film actresses 
Italian stage actresses 
Italian television actresses
Italian voice actresses
Accademia Nazionale di Arte Drammatica Silvio D'Amico alumni